{|

{{Infobox ship career
|Hide header=
|Ship country=France
|Ship flag= 
|Ship name=Bien-Aimé (sometimes written Bien-Aimée or 'Bienaymée) 
|Ship namesake=
|Ship ordered=24 April 1671 
|Ship builder=Toulon 
|Ship laid down=31 October 1671 
|Ship launched=20 March 1672 
|Ship acquired=
|Ship commissioned=
|Ship decommissioned=
|Ship in service=1672 
|Ship out of service= 1693 
|Ship renamed=
|Ship captured=
|Ship fate=
|Ship reinstated=
|Ship honours=
|Ship notes=
}}

|}Bien-Aimé was a rowing frigate of the French Navy, designed by Engineer Chapelle.

Career
Bien-Aimé was part of the squadron under Tourville that cruised off Tunis and Algiers in 1679. 

 Sources and references  NotesCitationsReferences'''
 

Frigates of the French Navy
1672 ships
Ships built in France